Mid-Atlantic Soft Matter Workshop or MASM is an interdisciplinary meeting on soft matter routinely hosted and participated in by research and educational organizations in the mid-Atlantic region of the United States.

The workshop consists of several talks relating to the field of soft matter given by invited lecturers, and these talks are interspersed with sessions of short, three-minute "sound-bite" talks that can be delivered by any participant.

History
MASM was started at Georgetown University and organized by Daniel Blair and Jeffrey Urbach of Georgetown University.

There have been 16 MASM meetings.  The 16th MASM meeting was hosted at National Institutes of Health (NIH) on July 29, 2015.

References
Notes

Bibliography

External links
 Official MASM website

Soft matter